Kyliane Dong (born 27 September 2004) is a French professional footballer who plays as a forward for Troyes.

Career
A youth product of Fleury and Troyes, he began his senior career with their reserves in 2021. He signed his first professional contract with the club on 16 June 2022, tying him to the club for 3 years. He made his professional debut with Troyes in a 3–2 Ligue 2 loss to Montpellier on 7 August 2022.

Personal life
Born in France, Dong is of Cameroonian descent.

References

External links
 
 

2004 births
Living people
Sportspeople from Essonne
French footballers
French sportspeople of Cameroonian descent
ES Troyes AC players
Ligue 1 players
Championnat National 3 players
Association football forwards